Jean-François Quint is a French mathematician, specializing in dynamical systems theory for homogeneous spaces.

He studied at the École normale supérieure de Lyon and then received his Ph.D. from École Normale Supérieure (ENS) in Paris under Yves Benoist with Thèse de Doctorat: Sous-groupes discrets des groupes de Lie semi-simples réels et p-adiques.

In 2002 he joined the faculty of the Institut Camille Jordan as Chargé de recherche of the Centre national de la recherche scientifique (CNRS). In 2005 he joined the staff working on "Ergodic theory and dynamics systems" of Laboratoire Analyse, Géométrie et Applications (LAGA) at the Institut Galilée of the University of Paris 13. Since 2012 he has worked as CNRS Directeur de recherche at the University of Bordeaux.

In 2011, Yves Benoist and Jean-François Quint received the Clay Research Award for their collaborative research (and Jonathan Pila also received the 2011 Clay Research Award for unrelated research).

Selected publications
 Mesures de Patterson-Sullivan en rang supérieur. Geom. Funct. Anal. 12 (2002), no. 4, 776–809. 
 with Benoist: Mesures stationnaires et fermés invariants des espaces homogènes, Parts 1,2, Comptes Rendus Mathématiques, vol. 347, 2009, pp. 9–13, vol. 349, 2011, pp. 341–345; and Annals of Mathematics, vol. 174, 2011, pp. 1111–1162 
 with Benoist: Random walks on finite volume homogeneous spaces, Inventiones Mathematicae, vol. 187, 2012, pp. 37–59 
 with Benoist: Stationary measures and invariant subsets of homogeneous spaces (II). J. Amer. Math. Soc. 26 (2013), no. 3, 659–734. 
 with Benoist: Stationary measures and invariant subsets of homogeneous spaces (III). Ann. of Math. (2) 178 (2013), no. 3, 1017–1059. 
 with Benoist:

References

External links
Jean-François Quint - Institut de Mathématiques de Bordeaux website
 Jean-François Quint - 1/6 Mesures stationnaires et fermés invariants des espaces homogènes, YouTube
 Jean-François Quint - 2/6 Mesures stationnaires et fermés invariants des espaces homogènes
 Jean-François Quint - 3/6 Mesures stationnaires et fermés invariants des espaces homogènes
 Jean-François Quint - 4/6 Mesures stationnaires et fermés invariants des espaces homogènes
 Jean-François Quint - 5/6 Mesures stationnaires et fermés invariants des espaces homogènes
 Jean-François Quint - 6/6 Mesures stationnaires et fermés invariants des espaces homogènes

21st-century French mathematicians
Dynamical systems theorists
Living people
Year of birth missing (living people)